Martin David Fry (born 9 March 1958) is an English singer, songwriter, composer, musician, and record producer.

Fry's music career spans more than 40 years. He came to prominence in the early 1980s as co-founder and lead singer of the pop band ABC, which released six singles that entered the top 20 charts in the United Kingdom during the 1980s, including "Tears Are Not Enough", "Poison Arrow", "The Look of Love", "All of My Heart", "That Was Then but This Is Now" and "When Smokey Sings". He is the only member who has been with ABC throughout its entire history and is currently its only official member.

Early years
Martin David Fry was born on 9 March 1958 in Stretford, Lancashire (now part of the Metropolitan Borough of Trafford in Greater Manchester) and grew up in nearby Bramhall, Stockport, alongside his younger brother Jamie, who later went on to join the indie rock band Earl Brutus. Fry was editing a fanzine titled Modern Drugs in 1978, and first met future ABC band members Mark White and Stephen Singleton while interviewing them for an article in the fanzine. White and Singleton, then fronting an electronic band called Vice Versa, invited Fry to join their band to play additional keyboards.

ABC

With Fry in place as lead singer and lyricist, Vice Versa changed their name to ABC and changed their sound to a contemporary pop style that at that time led them to be categorised with bands like Duran Duran, Spandau Ballet and the Human League. Between 1982 and 1991, ABC recorded six studio albums (The Lexicon of Love, Beauty Stab, How to Be a ... Zillionaire!, Alphabet City, Up and Abracadabra) and released a greatest hits compilation album, Absolutely. During this time, the band went through numerous personnel changes, with Fry and Mark White being its only permanent members.

Following the Zillionaire album, ABC temporarily fell from prominence while Fry was being treated for Hodgkin's lymphoma, an uncommon cancer.

ABC disbanded in 1991, with White retiring from music to pursue an interest in Reiki therapy. Fry continued to work with EMI in the months thereafter but was axed from the label before his solo material could be released. Fry resurrected the ABC name in 1997 for the album Skyscraping, a homage to several of his musical heroes, including David Bowie, Roxy Music and the Sex Pistols. The album was a collaboration with Glenn Gregory of Heaven 17 and Honeyroot's Keith Lowndes.

The band has toured extensively and performed live at events such as the 2001 Night of the Proms, where Fry was supported by a 72-piece orchestra and 50-piece choir. In 2008, Fry released a new ABC album titled Traffic.

In April 2009, Fry and original drummer David Palmer performed The Lexicon of Love album live at the Royal Albert Hall in London. The band was accompanied by the BBC Concert Orchestra. Anne Dudley of Art of Noise fame, who arranged and played keyboards on the original record, conducted the Royal Albert Hall performance.

Fry and Palmer (as ABC) toured the U.S. as part of the 2009 'Regeneration Tour', which also featured Terri Nunn of Berlin, Wang Chung and the Cutting Crew.

In April 2016, a single with a music video, "Viva Love" was released as a teaser for The Lexicon of Love II album. The album entered the UK Albums Chart at No. 5, the band's highest chart position since 1982 and first top 10 entry since 1990.

Other work

Besides working with ABC, Fry has also recorded and toured with other artists. 

In 1989, Fry recorded a song called "Mythical Girl" with Arthur Baker for Baker's album Merge, a project that included songs with various artists, including Love Is the Message featuring Al Green.
Together with Mark White, Fry co-wrote and produced a couple of songs on Paul Rutherford's 1989 solo album Oh World, including the single "Get Real".
In 1997, Fry contributed to David Arnold's Shaken and Stirred: The David Arnold James Bond Project, an album made up of re-recordings of James Bond movie themes featuring vocals by contemporary artists. The song Fry performed was the theme of Thunderball
In 2005, Fry embarked on an extensive UK tour with Tony Hadley, former lead singer of popular 1980s new wave band Spandau Ballet. Highlights of the tour were released on CD and DVD compilations, both titled Tony Hadley vs. Martin Fry. The DVD is available in Europe, but has yet to be released in NTSC format.
Fry appeared in the BBC Television program Just the Two of Us in 2006. This was a reality television competition in the style of Strictly Come Dancing, but this time with contestants (one celebrity being a famous singer, the other celeb being a novice) judged upon their singing skills as part of a duet. He was teamed with TV presenter Gaby Roslin and they were eliminated in the first show after battling the team of Nicky Campbell and Beverley Knight.
Fry was featured extensively in the 2006 VH1 mini-series 100 Greatest Songs of the 80's. When asked, Fry said that he hoped ABC's 1982 single "The Look of Love" would land a coveted slot in the top 10. Despite his wish, the song was ranked No. 43.
Fry worked on several songs for the 2007 movie Music and Lyrics starring Hugh Grant and Drew Barrymore. Fry also served as Grant's vocal coach for the movie.
Fry toured the U.S. in the summer of 2008 with the Regeneration Tour 2008, a show that also featured the Human League as the headliners, Belinda Carlisle, A Flock of Seagulls, and Naked Eyes.

Personal life 

On 19 July 2012, Fry received an honorary Doctor of Music degree from the University of Sheffield for his contribution of more than 30 years to music. The following day, his daughter, Nancy received her degree from the Department of Sociological Studies from the same university.

As of 2016, he has been married to his wife Julie for more than 30 years.

Discography 
ABC

Citations

External links 

 
 
 

1958 births
20th-century English singers
21st-century English singers
20th-century English musicians
21st-century English musicians
ABC (band) members
English new wave musicians
English record producers
English songwriters
English tenors
Living people
Male new wave singers
Musicians from Greater Manchester
People educated at Bramhall High School
People from Bramhall
Sophisti-pop musicians
Synth-pop singers